Miss Piggy is one of the Muppet characters known for her breakout role in Jim Henson's The Muppet Show. Since her debut in 1976, Miss Piggy has been notable for her temperamental diva superstar personality, tendency to use French phrases in her speech, and practice of karate. She was also known for her on-again/off-again relationship with Kermit the Frog which never ends permanently. Frank Oz performed the character from 1976 to 2000, 2002 and was succeeded by Eric Jacobson in 2001.
Miss Piggy was inspired by jazz singer Peggy Lee.

In 1996, TV Guide ranked her number 23 on its 50 Greatest TV Stars of All Time list. In a 2001 Channel 4 poll in the UK, Miss Piggy was ranked 29th on their list of the 100 Greatest TV Characters. In 1996, a cook book entitled In the Kitchen With Miss Piggy: Fabulous Recipes from My Famous Celebrity Friends by Moi was released.

Characterization

Origins and description
In a 1979 interview with The New York Times, performer Frank Oz outlined Piggy's biography: "She grew up in a small town (most likely Keystone, Iowa); her father died when she was young and her mother wasn't that nice to her. She had to enter beauty contests to survive. She has a lot of vulnerability which she has to hide, because of her need to be a superstar". During development of The Muppet Show, Oz assigned a hook for each Muppet he performed; Miss Piggy's hook was a "truck driver wanting to be a woman". Oz has also stated that while Fozzie Bear is a two-dimensional character and Animal has no dimensions, Miss Piggy is one of the few Muppet characters to be fully realized in three dimensions.

Piggy, truly a diva in a class of her own, is convinced she is destined for stardom, and nothing will stand in her way. She has a capricious nature, at times determined to (and often succeeding in) conveying an image of feminine charm, but suddenly flying into a violent rage (accompanied by her trademark karate chop and "hi-yah!") whenever she thinks someone has insulted or thwarted her. Kermit the Frog has learned this all too well; when she is not smothering him in kisses, she is sending him flying through the air with a karate chop.

She loves wearing long gloves; Hildegarde, who used to wear them, once said, "Miss Piggy stole the gloves idea from me”.

Relationship with Kermit
Since the debut of The Muppet Show, the romantic relationship between Miss Piggy and Kermit the Frog has been subject to substantial coverage and commentary by the media. Throughout The Muppet Show's run, Miss Piggy's romantic pursuit for Kermit was consistently expressed. Kermit, however, constantly rebuffed Piggy's feelings. Eventually, in the films, Kermit began returning her affections and even (unwittingly) marries her in The Muppets Take Manhattan. However, subsequent events suggest that the marriage was simply fictional. It is mentioned by Miss Piggy, however, in The Muppets: A Celebration of 30 Years (1986) that Kermit was a happily married frog. This marriage isn't referenced in Muppets Most Wanted.

Miss Piggy and Kermit formally ended their romantic relationship on May 10, 1990. The decision was made by Jim Henson Productions and a publicity campaign titled "The Pig of the Nineties" was scheduled to follow. An autobiography of Piggy was expected to be published as part of the effort. However, shortly after the announcement on May 16, Jim Henson died and the campaign was dropped altogether. The two eventually resumed their relationship.

In 2015, Miss Piggy and Kermit ended their romantic relationship for a second time.

Performers
Frank Oz was Miss Piggy's principal performer from her early appearances on The Muppet Show until his departure from the cast in 2000; his last known performance as Piggy was an appearance on The Today Show. Oz's earliest known performance as Piggy was actually in a 1974 appearance on The Tonight Show. Richard Hunt occasionally performed Miss Piggy during the first season of The Muppet Show, alternating with Oz. In 2002, Eric Jacobson was cast as the new performer of Miss Piggy, and his first public debut as the character was performed via satellite at the 2001 MuppetFest. Jacobson has remained Piggy's principal performer since then, openly describing the role as "one of the most famous drag acts in the business."

During Oz's tenure as the character, other performers would step in. Jerry Nelson performed Piggy in 1974 for a brief appearance on Herb Alpert & the Tijuana Brass. Fran Brill performed Piggy for The Muppet Show: Sex and Violence, a pilot for The Muppet Show. Kevin Clash and Peter Linz puppeteered Piggy for most of the filming of Muppet Treasure Island and Muppets from Space, respectively, with Oz dubbing in Piggy's voice in post production. Victor Yerrid briefly performed Piggy in Muppets Ahoy!, a 2006 stage show for the Disney Cruise Line. In Muppet Babies, Piggy's voice was provided by voice actress Laurie O'Brien. Voice actor Hal Rayle provided her voice for a short-lived spin-off series, Little Muppet Monsters. Melanie Harrison voices Baby Piggy on the 2018 reboot of Muppet Babies.

History
The first known appearance of Miss Piggy was on the Herb Alpert television special Herb Alpert and the TJB, broadcast on October 13, 1974, on ABC. Miss Piggy's voice was noticeably more demure and soft, singing with Herb, "I Can't Give You Anything but Love." The first draft of the puppet was an unnamed blonde, beady-eyed pig who appeared briefly in the 1975 pilot special The Muppet Show: Sex and Violence, in a sketch called "Return to Beneath the Planet of the Pigs." She was unnamed in that show, but by the time The Muppet Show began in 1976, she had assumed something resembling her classic look—a pig with large blue eyes, a flowing silver gown, satin white long gloves, blue sheer shawl, and a hopelessly romantic persona.

The Muppet Show
Miss Piggy began as a minor chorus pig on The Muppet Show but gradually developed into one of the central characters of the series, as the writers and producers of The Muppet Show recognized that a lovelorn pig could be more than a one-note running gag. She spawned a huge fad during the late 1970s and early 1980s and eclipsed Kermit and the other Muppets in popularity at that time, selling far more merchandise and writing a book entitled Miss Piggy's Guide to Life that, unlike any of Kermit's books, wound up on top of the New York Times Bestseller List.

Miss Piggy's personality and voice were seen and heard in other female characters performed by Frank Oz before the character's debut. For instance, a Sesame Street Muppet skit from 1971 featured Snow White performed by Frank Oz and acting (as well as sounding) like Miss Piggy. Another sound-alike came from a contestant in a Guy Smiley sketch called "The Mystery Mix-Up Game".

In The Muppet Show episode 106, Piggy is referred to by the full name "Piggy Lee", and in episode 116, Piggy tells guest star Avery Schreiber that Piggy is short for "Pigathius", "from the Greek, meaning 'river of passion'". Also during the Jim Nabors episode when asked what (astrological) sign she was born under she replied that she was not born under a sign, she was born over one, "Becker's Butcher shop". She portrayed "Wonder Pig", a spoof of Wonder Woman in episode 419 while Lynda Carter sang "The Rubberband Man" and "Orange Colored Sky".

Foo-Foo
In the series, Miss Piggy owned a pet, a white Toy poodle named Foo-Foo (performed by Steve Whitmire), who is one of the few characters that does not speak. Piggy is often seen as very tender towards her, although to the point of sickly saccharine baby talk. On The Muppet Show, Foo-Foo was portrayed as both a muppet and a real dog in different shots. Foo-Foo mostly appears as a sidekick to Miss Piggy in most movies and specials.

Films and television series
Miss Piggy has appeared in all the Muppet films and television series following The Muppet Show. In The Muppet Movie, she has just won a beauty contest when she first meets Kermit and joins the Muppets. In The Great Muppet Caper, Miss Piggy plays an aspiring fashion model who gets caught up in a screwball-comedy misunderstanding involving a gang of jewel thieves. Piggy proves she has a talent for tap dancing, seemingly without knowing it. She and Kermit also kiss (on the lips, yet slightly covered) while Miss Piggy is a prisoner in jail; Miss Piggy ends up wearing Kermit's fake mustache, while Kermit has X-marks on his upper lip.

Eventually, in the films, Kermit started returning her affections and (unwittingly) marries her in The Muppets Take Manhattan, though subsequent events suggest that it was only their characters in the movie that married, and that their relationship is really the same as ever. It is mentioned by Miss Piggy, however, in The Muppets: A Celebration of 30 Years (which taped in 1985) that Kermit was a happily-married frog. This special aired two years after The Muppets Take Manhattan. This is really the only indication outside of a movie that Miss Piggy and Kermit the Frog were married. This marriage isn't referenced in Muppets Most Wanted and the two get married again in this film.

In The Muppet Christmas Carol, she appears as Mrs. Cratchit, to Kermit's Bob Cratchit.

In Muppet Treasure Island, the part of crazed Ben Gunn was adapted to fit Miss Piggy, and "Benjamina" Gunn was revealed to be Captain Smollett's (played by Kermit) former lover. The two share a tender moment dueting on "Love Led Us Here".

Her part is significant but supporting in Muppets from Space, as the plucky news reporter eager to scoop the news on her friend Gonzo's bizarre alien encounters.

In the TV-movie It's a Very Merry Muppet Christmas Movie, a take on the Christmas classic It's a Wonderful Life, the characters are seen in an alternate universe, one without Kermit. Miss Piggy becomes a spinster cat lady, doing "psychic" readings on the phone.

In The Muppets, Miss Piggy is shown to be residing in Paris, having become the plus-size editor for Vogue after the Muppets disbanded, and after she left Kermit in Los Angeles and run off with a wealthy lynx.

In Muppets Most Wanted, having rejoined the Muppets on a global tour, she nearly marries Constantine in London, after he poses as Kermit.

In the TV series The Muppets, Miss Piggy hosts the late-night talk show Up Late with Miss Piggy.

In Muppets Now, she hosts the segment "Lifesty(le) with Miss Piggy".

In Muppets Haunted Mansion, she appears as herself dressed as Kermit for Halloween (with Kermit dressed as Piggy) and later appears as Madame Pigota.

Other appearances
In 1987, Miss Piggy was a guest star on Dolly Parton's musical variety show, Dolly, singing and performing with Parton, while at the same time secretly attempting to steal the show from her host, mostly by sabotaging Parton's musical segments and attempting to trick producers into giving her more solo spots. Parton, annoyed at being undermined by Miss Piggy, told another of her guests, Juice Newton, that they might be "having ham sandwiches after the show".

Miss Piggy sang with the Jonas Brothers as "Joan S. Jonas", with Ashley Tisdale during the number "Bop to the Top", and with the Cheetah Girls performing "Dance Me If You Can" as a part of Studio DC: Almost Live. A running gag from those first two episodes involved Miss Piggy looking for "Zacky" Efron. Miss Piggy made a special guest appearance on Take Two with Phineas and Ferb and sang "Spa Day" with Phineas and Ferb.

Miss Piggy made a number of appearances in 2011 and 2012 to promote The Muppets. Miss Piggy made a special guest appearance on the Disney Channel Original Series So Random! alongside Sterling Knight (who made a special cameo appearance on The Muppets that was deleted from the final cut). She was the first guest on The Tonight Show with Jay Leno November 4, 2011, appeared on Chelsea Lately on November 21, 2011, and sang "Dance with Me Tonight" with Olly Murs on the UK The X Factor on November 27, 2011. On November 19, 2011, Miss Piggy, alongside her fellow Muppets and Jason Segel, participated in the opening monologue of Saturday Night Live by singing "I Can't Believe I'm Hosting SNL".

Miss Piggy and her fellow Muppets made a guest appearance on the Halloween 2011 episode of WWE Raw.

In an episode aired January 19, 2012, Miss Piggy appeared on Project Runway: All Stars Season 1 as a guest judge for clothes designed for her character in the movie. She also appeared on the British morning breakfast show This Morning alongside Kermit, Rizzo, and Beaker. On February 9, 2012, Miss Piggy appeared on Lawro's Predictions on BBC Football's website to predict the coming week's Premier League matches. Along with Kermit the Frog, they made only three predictions including a 63–25 win for Liverpool against Manchester United. She also starred in E! Fashion Police.

On Friday, March 15, 2013, Miss Piggy appeared on the UK telethon Comic Relief to reveal the cash total and introduce boy band One Direction. She was in Dream House 2013. On December 6, 2013, she performed 'Somethin' Stupid' alongside Robbie Williams at the London Palladium. In 2015, Miss Piggy received a Sackler Center First Award from the Elizabeth A. Sackler Center for Feminist Art at the Brooklyn Museum. An essay was written for Time magazine as if by Miss Piggy, titled "Why I Am a Feminist Pig", explaining why she deserved the award.

In 2014, Miss Piggy appeared in an advertisement for Wonderful Pistachios.

Miss Piggy had her own luxury brand featured on QVC, "Moi by Miss Piggy". The name had previously been used by a perfume released in 1998.

Albums

The Muppet Movie (soundtrack) (1979)
The Great Muppet Caper (soundtrack) (1981)
Miss Piggy's Aerobique Exercise Workout Album (1982)
The Muppets Take Manhattan (soundtrack) (1984)
The Muppet Christmas Carol (soundtrack) (1992)
Muppet Treasure Island (soundtrack) (1996)
It's a Very Merry Muppet Christmas Movie (2002)
The Muppets' Wizard of Oz (soundtrack) (2005)
A Muppets Christmas: Letters to Santa (soundtrack) (2008)
The Muppets (soundtrack) (2011)
Muppets Most Wanted (soundtrack) (2014)

Filmography

 The Muppet Show (1976–1981) (TV)
 The Muppet Movie (1979)
 The Great Muppet Caper (1981)
 The Muppets Take Manhattan (1984)
 Muppet Babies (1984–1991) (TV)
 The Muppet Christmas Carol (1992) – Appearance as Emily Cratchit
 Muppet Treasure Island (1996) – Appearance as Benjamina Gunn
 Muppets Tonight (1996–1998) (TV)
 Muppets from Space (1999)
 It's a Very Merry Muppet Christmas Movie (2002) (TV)
 The Muppets' Wizard of Oz (2005) (TV) – Appearance as Herself and the Wicked Witch of the West, Good Witch of the North, Glinda the Good Witch, Wicked Witch of the East
 A Muppets Christmas: Letters to Santa (2008) (TV)
 Studio DC: Almost Live (2008) (TV)
 The Muppets (2011)
 Lady Gaga and the Muppets Holiday Spectacular (2013) (TV)
 Muppets Most Wanted (2014)
 The Muppets (2015–2016) (TV)
 Muppet Babies (2018–2022) (TV)
 Muppets Now (2020) (Disney+)
 RuPaul's Drag Race All Stars (2021) (Paramount+)
 Holey Moley (2022) (Special Guest Appearance)

References

External links

 at Disney.com
Tough Pigs: Transcripts of Miss Piggy and Kermit interviews

The Muppets characters
Anthropomorphic mammals
Fictional pigs
Fictional actors
Fictional characters from Iowa
Fictional feminists and women's rights activists
Fictional singers
Fictional models
Fictional beauty queens
Fictional television personalities
Fictional karateka
Television characters introduced in 1974
Female characters in television